Possession Street is a street in Sheung Wan, from Queen's Road West to Hollywood Road, on the Hong Kong Island in Hong Kong. The street marks the boundary of Queen's Road West and Queen's Road Central.

Name

History
On 20 January 1841, Charles Elliot of Britain and Qishan of the Qing dynasty agreed to the Convention of Chuenpi. A navy official Edward Belcher led a fleet to land in Hong Kong. The surveyors of fleet found an elevated plain near the shore suitable for camping in the west side of the island. A road was built from the shore to the camp. The road became Possession Street later. The elevated plain is present-day Hollywood Road Garden, also known as Tai Tat Tei.

On 26 January 1841, the commander of Far East Fleet James John Gordon Bremer came to Hong Kong by HMS Calliope. A flag rise and gun ceremony marked the official possession of Hong Kong. And the landing venue was renamed as Possession Point.

At the end of the 19th century, the street was full of brothels, until 1903, when they were relocated to Shek Tong Tsui and the premises was replaced with housing. It resulted in the golden period of Shek Tong Tsui, tong sai fung yuet, where wealthy Chinese merchants gathered.

See also

 List of streets and roads in Hong Kong
 History of Hong Kong (1800s–1930s)
 Flagstaff Hill, Tai Po

References

Sheung Wan
Roads on Hong Kong Island